The 2021–22 Oklahoma State Cowgirls basketball team represented Oklahoma State University in the 2020–21 NCAA Division I women's basketball season. The Cowgirls, led by eleventh year head coach Jim Littell, played their home games at Gallagher-Iba Arena and were members of the Big 12 Conference.

They finished the season 9–20 overall, and 3–15 in Big 12 play to finish in ninth place.  As the ninth seed in the Big 12 Tournament they defeated Texas Tech in the First Round before losing to first seed Baylor in the Quarterfinals. They were not invited to the NCAA tournament or the WNIT.

Previous season

The Cowgirls finished the season 19–9, 13–5 in Big 12 play to finish in a tie for second place. As the third seed in the Big 12 Tournament they defeated Oklahoma in the Quarterfinals before losing to West Virginia in the Semifinals.  They received an at-large bid to the NCAA women's basketball tournament.  As the eight seed in the Alamo Regional, the defeated Wake Forest in the First Round before losing to eventual champions Stanford in the Second Round.

Roster

Schedule and results

Source:

|-
!colspan=6 style=|Exhibition

|-
!colspan=6 style=|Non-Conference Regular season

|-
!colspan=6 style=|Big 12 Regular season

|-
!colspan=6 style=| Big 12 Women's Tournament

Rankings

The Coaches Poll did not release a Week 2 poll and the AP Poll did not release a poll after the NCAA Tournament.

References

2021-22
2021–22 Big 12 Conference women's basketball season
2022 in sports in Oklahoma
2021 in sports in Oklahoma